A list of musical groups and artists who were active in the 1960s and associated with music in the decade:

A

B

C

D

E

F

G

H-J

K-N

O-R

S

T-Z

See also
:Category:Musical groups established in the 1960s

1960s in music
Music-related lists
Lists of musicians by decade
1960s-related lists